Nene Dorgeles (born 23 December 2002) is a Malian professional footballer who plays as an attacking midfielder for Belgian club Westerlo on loan from Red Bull Salzburg, and the Mali national team.

Club career
Dorgeles started his career with FC Guidars and JMG Academy Bamako. On 4 January 2021, Austrian club Red Bull Salzburg announced the signing of Dorgeles along with Mamady Diambou and Daouda Guindo. All of them signed professional contracts with the club until 31 May 2025 and became cooperation players at Liefering. He made his professional debut on 12 February 2021 in Liefering's 3–1 league win against Austria Lustenau.

On 27 January 2022, Dorgeles moved on loan to SV Ried.

On 30 June 2022, Dorgeles was loaned to Westerlo in Belgium for the 2022–23 season.

International career
Dorgeles debuted with the Mali national team in a 1–0 2022 World Cup qualification loss to Tunisia on 25 March 2022.

Career statistics

Club

International

References

External links

 

2002 births
Living people
Association football midfielders
Malian footballers
Mali international footballers
2. Liga (Austria) players
FC Red Bull Salzburg players
FC Liefering players
SV Ried players
K.V.C. Westerlo players
Malian expatriate footballers
Malian expatriate sportspeople in Austria
Malian expatriate sportspeople in Belgium
Expatriate footballers in Austria
Expatriate footballers in Belgium
JMG Academy players